Exhibition (aka London Project) is a 2013 drama film written and directed by Joanna Hogg, starring Viv Albertine, Liam Gillick, and Tom Hiddleston. The film premiered at the Locarno Film Festival in August 2013, and was released in the UK on 25 April 2014.

Summary
A contemporary artist couple, D (Albertine) and H (Gillick), have their living and working patterns threatened when their house is put up for sale.

Cast
Liam Gillick as H
Viv Albertine as D
Tom Hiddleston as Jamie Macmillan
Harry Kershaw as Estate Agent
Mary Roscoe as Neighbour Guest

Production

Development
Writer and director Joanna Hogg and actor Tom Hiddleston previously worked together on Hogg's 2007 film Unrelated and her 2010 film Archipelago.

Filming
Filming started in October 2012 and took place over the course of 6 weeks in London.

References

External links

Films shot in London
Films directed by Joanna Hogg
2013 drama films
BBC Film films
2013 films
British drama films
2010s English-language films
2010s British films